Chinese people in Belgium or Chinese Belgians (simplified Chinese: 比利时华侨; Traditional Chinese: 比利時華僑; pinyin: Bǐlìshí huáqiáo) are Belgian citizens of Chinese ancestry.
There is a small ethnic Chinese community in Belgium, compared to neighbouring Netherlands, Germany and France.

History
Single male sailors who wished to reestablish their lives in a foreign country made up the first Chinese living in Belgium. Beginning in the 1950s people from the New Territories of Hong Kong began to settle Europe. They moved due to a lack of jobs in Hong Kong and political developments in Mainland China. Chinese people arrived until the end of the 1960s.

Demographics

Since 1994, Belgium had 3,463 persons with Mainland Chinese citizenship, including 1,788 females and 1,675 males; and 489 persons with Republic of China (Taiwan) citizenship, including (278 females and 115 males). However, as of 1998 most Chinese in Belgium originated in Hong Kong. Prior to 1997 were counted as "British" when they arrived, and by 1998 many had naturalized as Belgian citizens. Therefore, they were not counted as ethnic Chinese people living in Belgium. Pang Ching Lin (彭靜蓮, Pinyin: Péng Jìnglián), author of "Invisible Visibility: Intergenerational Transfer of Identity and Social Position of Chinese Women in Belgium," stated that therefore there is a lack of records specifically tracking Chinese people, and therefore there is an element of invisibility.

In 2008, De Morgen reported that the total of Han Chinese living in Belgium are estimated to be around 30.000.

In 2017, there are 12.155 Chinese foreigners in Belgium. That number is only counted for those who are from the People's Republic of China and aren't counted to those who are naturalized. Ethnic Chinese people from other countries such as Hongkongers, Taiwanese and Chinese Singaporeans are not counted as well.

As of 2020, Vedia estimates the number of ethnic Chinese in Belgium at around 40.000.

Institutions
There are multiple Chinese organisations in Belgium, but they do not regularly cooperate with one another. They sometimes cooperate during some political events supported by the Mainland Chinese government and during the Mid-Autumn Festival and the Chinese New Year.

Notable individuals

Xavier Chen (1983), footballer
Dion Cools (1996), footballer
Dong Fangzhuo (1985), footballer
Nadine Hwang (1902–1972), pilot
Chaiyapol Julien Poupart (1990), model and actor
Angeline Flor Pua (1995), model
Han Suyin (1916–2012), physician and author
Lianne Tan (1990), badminton player
Yuhan Tan (1987), badminton player
Lou Tseng-Tsiang (1871–1949), diplomat and Roman Catholic priest
Steven Wong (1988), BMX cyclist

References
Liu Huang, Li-Chuan. "A Biographical Study of Chinese Immigrants in Belgium: Strategies for Localisation" (Part IV: Chinese Migration in Other Countries: Chapter 13). In: Zhang, Jijiao and Howard Duncan. Migration in China and Asia: Experience and Policy (Volume 10 of International Perspectives on Migration). Springer Science & Business Media, April 8, 2014. , 9789401787598. Start p. 207.
Pang, Ching Lin (Katholieke Universiteit Leuven). "Invisible Visibility: Intergenerational Transfer of Identity and Social Position of Chinese Women in Belgium." Asian and Pacific Migration Journal. December 1998 vol. 7 no. 4 433-452. DOI 10.1177/011719689800700402 .

Notes

Belgium
Belgium
 
Ethnic groups in Belgium
Belgium–China relations